General Lord Robert Edward Henry Somerset  (19 December 17761 September 1842) was a British soldier who fought during the Peninsular War and the War of the Seventh Coalition.

Life
Somerset was the third son of Henry Somerset, 5th Duke of Beaufort, and elder brother of Lord Raglan.

Joining the 15th Light Dragoons in 1793, he became captain in the following year, and received a majority after serving as aide-de-camp to Prince Frederick, Duke of York in the Dutch expedition of 1799. At the end of 1800 he became a lieutenant-colonel, and in 1801 received the command of the 4th Dragoons. From 1799 to 1802 he represented the Borough of Monmouth in the House of Commons, from 1803 to 1823 and from 1830 sat for Gloucestershire and from 1834 to 1837 was MP for Cirencester.

He commanded his regiment at the battles of Talavera and Buçaco, and in 1810 received a colonelcy and the appointment of aide-de-camp to the king. In 1811, along with the 3rd Dragoon Guards, the 4th Dragoons fought a notable cavalry action at Usagre, and in 1812 Lord Edward Somerset was engaged in the great charge of Le Marchant's heavy cavalry at Salamanca. His conduct on this occasion (he captured five guns at the head of a single squadron) won him further promotion, and he made the remaining campaigns as a major-general at the head of the Hussar brigade (7th, 10th and 15th Hussars).

At Orthes he won further distinction by his pursuit of the enemy; he was made KCB, and received the thanks of parliament. At Waterloo he was in command of the Household Cavalry Brigade, which distinguished itself not less by its stern and patient endurance of the enemy's fire than by its celebrated charge on the cuirassiers of Milhaud's corps.

The brigadier was particularly mentioned in Wellington's despatches, and received the thanks of parliament as well as the Army Gold Cross with one clasp for his services at Talavera, Salamanca, Vitoria, Orthez, and Toulouse. He also received the Military Order of Maria Theresa and was made an honorary Knight Commander of the Royal Portuguese Military Order of the Tower and Sword.

At Waterloo in 1815 he lost his hat during the first cavalry charge and in the subsequent search for it a cannonball tore off the flap of his coat and killed his horse. He was awarded a GCB in 1834.

After a short illness he died in London on 10December 1842 and was interred in the church of St. George's, Hanover Square. A memorial tablet to Lord Robert Edward is on the south wall of the nave at St. Michael and All Angels, Great Badminton, which is attached to the family seat, Badminton House.

The 'Somerset Monument' stands high on the Cotswold Edge at Hawkesbury, Gloucestershire, near the family's ancestral home of Badminton, Gloucestershire. It was erected in 1846 and has an inscription in memory of General Lord Robert Somerset.

Family
On 17 October 1805 he married Lady Louisa Augusta Courtenay (17818 February 1825), a younger daughter of William Courtenay, 8th Earl of Devon, with whom he had several children, three sons and five daughters:
  Robert Henry Somerset (1806–1807)
  Louisa Isabella Somerset (1807–1888) who died unmarried.
  Frances Caroline Somerset, later Mrs Theophilus Clive (1808–1890) who married 1840 Theophilus Clive (died 1875), and had issue 1 son who left descendants.
  Blanche Somerset, later Mrs Charles Locke (1811–1879) who married 1845, Rev. Charles Courtenay Locke (died 1848) with no issue,
  Matilda Elizabeth Somerset, later Mrs Horace Marryat (18153 April 1905) who married 1842 Horace Marryat, and had issue two sons: Adrian Somerset Marryat (born 1844) and Frederick Marryat (born 1851), and one daughter Ida Horatia Charlotte Marryat (1843–1910) who married 19 September 1863 (div 1889) Count Gustavus Frederick Bonde (1842–1909), a Swedish nobleman, with issue. The three Marryat children were painted in 1851–2 in Rome by the young Frederick Leighton. Horace Marryat was a much younger brother of the naval officer and writer Frederick Marryat (1792–1848)
  Lieutenant-General Edward Arthur Somerset (1817–1886) married Agatha Miles (1827–1912), daughter of Sir William Miles, Bt and had one son (Lieut Edward William Henry Somerset, 25 January 186620 March 1890, who died unmarried) and eight daughters.
  Georgina Emily Somerset, later the Hon. Mrs Robert Lawley (born 1819) who married 1852 Hon Robert Neville Lawley (who died 1891), and died without issue.
  Augustus Charles Stapleton Somerset (1821–1854) who died unmarried.

Ancestry

References

External links 
 
 British cavalry of the Napoleonic Wars

|-

1776 births
1842 deaths
Military personnel from Gloucestershire
Knights Grand Cross of the Order of the Bath
People of the Peninsular War
British Army generals
British Army personnel of the French Revolutionary Wars
British Army commanders of the Napoleonic Wars
Younger sons of dukes
Members of the Parliament of Great Britain for Welsh constituencies
British MPs 1796–1800
Members of the Parliament of the United Kingdom for English constituencies
Members of the Parliament of the United Kingdom for Welsh constituencies
UK MPs 1801–1802
UK MPs 1802–1806
UK MPs 1806–1807
UK MPs 1807–1812
UK MPs 1812–1818
UK MPs 1818–1820
UK MPs 1820–1826
UK MPs 1830–1831
UK MPs 1832–1835
UK MPs 1835–1837
Robert
1st The Royal Dragoons officers
15th The King's Hussars officers
17th Lancers officers
4th Queen's Own Hussars officers
Recipients of the Army Gold Cross
Recipients of the Waterloo Medal
Recipients of the Order of the Tower and Sword
Recipients of the Order of St. Vladimir, 3rd class
Knights Cross of the Military Order of Maria Theresa
People from Badminton, Gloucestershire